This list of University of Notre Dame athletes includes graduates, non-graduate former students, and current students of Notre Dame who are notable for their achievements within athletics, sometimes before or after their time at Notre Dame. Other alumni can be found in the list of University of Notre Dame alumni.

Although Notre Dame is highly ranked academically, it has also been called a "jock school" as it has produced a large number of athletes.  Intercollegiate sports teams at Notre Dame are called the "Fighting Irish". Notre Dame offers 13 varsity sports for both men and women: Men's American Football, Men's Baseball, Men's and Women's Basketball, Men's and Women's Cross Country, Men's and Women's Fencing, Men's and Women's Golf, Men's Ice Hockey, Men's and Women's Lacrosse, Women's Rowing, Men's and Women's Soccer, Women's Softball, Men's and Women's Swimming and Diving, Men's and Women's Tennis, Men's and Women's Track and Field, and Women's Volleyball. Approximately 400 students have gone on to play professional American football in the National Football League, the American Football League, or the All-America Football Conference, with many others going to play other sports professionally. Some athletes have also participated in the Olympic Games.

American football

Nate Silver, football quarterback

Baseball

Basketball

 Bonzie Colson (born 1996), player for Maccabi Tel Aviv of the Israeli Basketball Premier League

Ice hockey

Olympians

Nick Itkin (born 1999), Olympic bronze medalist fencer, junior world champion, 2x NCAA champion for Notre Dame.

Soccer

Track and field

Other

References

External links 
 University of Notre Dame official website
 Notre Dame Fighting Irish Athletic website
 

 
University of Notre Dame athletes
Notre Dame athletes
Athletes